Winthrop is a hamlet and census-designated place (CDP) in the town of Stockholm in St. Lawrence County, New York, United States. As of the 2010 census, it had a population of 510.

The community is in northeastern St. Lawrence County, in the northeastern part of the town of Stockholm. It is bordered to the northeast by the community of Brasher Falls in the town of Brasher. The St. Regis River, a tributary of the St. Lawrence River, forms the southeastern border.

New York State Route 11C passes through Winthrop, leading southwest  to U.S. Route 11 at Stockholm Center, and looping northeast, east, and south  to rejoin Route 11 at Cotey Corners in the town of Lawrence. State Route 420 crosses NY 11C in the center of Winthrop; it leads north-northwest  to Massena and south  to US-11.

Demographics

References 

Census-designated places in St. Lawrence County, New York
Census-designated places in New York (state)